The Social Democratic People's Party is a centre-left, social democratic political party, in Djibouti, founded in 2002 and led by Moumin Bahdon Farah. It is part of the governing coalition, the Union for a Presidential Majority (UMP).

Prior to founding the PPSD, Farah was Minister of Foreign Affairs and Secretary-General of the People's Rally for Progress (RPP), the governing party. He was removed from the RPP leadership in 1996 and joined the opposition. Farah subsequently founded the PPSD in 2002; he filed a declaration for the PPSD at the Interior Ministry on 26 October 2002, and Interior Minister Abdoulkader Doualeh Waïs announced that the party was legally registered on 31 October 2002. Speaking in a television interview on 22 November 2002, Farah said that his new party was not part of the opposition, expressing support for the government and stating that the PPSD planned to ally with the RPP. The party opened its first congress on 7 December 2002. In the parliamentary election held on 10 January 2003, the PPSD was part of the Union for the Presidential Majority (Union pour la Majorité Présidentielle), which won 62.7% of the popular vote and all seats. 

The PPSD held an extraordinary congress on 25 November 2004, at which Farah announced the party's support for President Ismail Omar Guelleh's candidacy in the April 2005 presidential election. The party remained part of the UMP in the February 2008 parliamentary election.

Electoral history

National Assembly elections

References

Political parties in Djibouti
Political parties established in 2002
Social democratic parties in Africa
2002 establishments in Djibouti
Socialism in Djibouti